Last of the Sane is the fifth album by the American metalcore band Earth Crisis, which was released in 2001. After this album the band split up and Karl Buechner, Erick Edwards and Bulldog went on to form the band Freya. This album mostly consist of cover songs by other bands.

Track listing
 "Hell Awaits (Intro)" (Slayer) - 2:24
 "The Wanton Song" (Led Zeppelin) - 4:17
 "Children of the Grave" (Black Sabbath) - 4:42
 "Paint it Black" (Rolling Stones) - 2:40
 "Holiday In Cambodia" (Dead Kennedys) - 4:18
 "City to City" (DYS) - 1:58
 "Earth A.D." (The Misfits) - 2:44
 "The Order" - 3:40
 "Broken Foundation" - 4:07
 "Gomorrah's Season Ends" - 3:29
 "Panic Floods" - 3:36

Credits
Karl Buechner - vocals
Scott Crouse - guitar
Erick Edwards - guitar
Bulldog - bass
Dennis Merrick - drums

Trivia
 On the back of the album some tracks are mislabeled. Track 3 is actually "Children of the Grave", track 4 is "Paint it Black", and track 6 is "City to City".

References

Earth Crisis albums
Covers albums
2001 albums
Victory Records albums